Zero Racers is an unreleased racing video game that was in development and planned to be published by Nintendo on a scheduled 1996 release date exclusively for the Virtual Boy. Had it been released prior to cancellation, it would have become the first F-Zero installment to have featured 3D graphics. In the game, players can choose between one of four characters, each with their respective hovercar and race against AI-controlled characters in fifteen tracks divided into three leagues. The title was previewed in video game magazines but it was ultimately shelved due to the failure of the Virtual Boy itself, despite being completed for release.

Gameplay 

Zero Racers is a futuristic racing game where players compete in a high-speed racing tournament. There are four F-Zero characters that have their own selectable vehicle along with its unique performance abilities. The objective is to beat opponents to the finish while avoiding hazards that damage the players' vehicle. Each machine has a power meter, serving as measurement of the machine's durability; it decreases when the machine collides with the side of the track or another vehicle. Energy is replenished by driving over pit areas placed along the home straight or nearby. Gameplay differs with one important point from its predecessor and all F-Zero games released afterwards in that the vehicles race in all three dimensions in tunnels.

A race in Zero Racers consists of a set lap number around the track. The player must complete each lap in a successively higher place to avoid disqualification from the race. For each lap completed, the player is rewarded with an approximate speed boost called "Rapid" and a number of points determined by place. An on-screen display is shown to indicate that a boost can be used; however, the player is limited to saving up to three at a time. If a certain number of points are accumulated, an "extra machine" is acquired that gives the player another chance to retry the course.

Zero Racers includes two modes of play. In the Grand Prix mode, the player chooses a league and races against other vehicles through each track in that league while avoiding disqualification. A total of fifteen tracks divided into three leagues are featured in the game. The Practice mode allows the player to practice on courses from the Grand Prix mode.

History 
Zero Racers was first previewed by Nintendo Power magazine in their July 1996 issue under the name G-Zero and planned for a fall 1996 launch. The game later received an in-depth feature article on August of the same year by Nintendo Power under its final name and still planned for a fall 1996 release. The title was also previewed in the September 1996 issue of British publication Nintendo Magazine System, but was eventually cancelled due to Nintendo discontinuing the Virtual Boy for being a critical and commercial failure. The last showcase it received was in the October 1998 issue of Electronic Gaming Monthly. The only remaining proof of its existence are various screenshots taken by several gaming magazines and gameplay footage, while no prototypes containing a ROM image of the demo has been found to date.

Notes

References

External links 
 Zero Racers at Planet Virtual Boy
 Zero Racers at Virtual-Boy.Net

1996 video games
Cancelled Virtual Boy games
F-Zero
Racing video games
Single-player video games
Video games developed in Japan